Nuri Edikovich Abdokov (born 16 July 2000) is a Russian football player who plays for FC Kuban Krasnodar.

Club career
He made his debut in the Russian Football National League for FC Kuban Krasnodar on 10 July 2021 in a game against FC Torpedo Moscow.

References

External links
 
 Profile by Russian Football National League

2000 births
Sportspeople from Karachay-Cherkessia
People from Khabezsky District
Living people
Russian footballers
Association football midfielders
FC Dynamo Stavropol players
FC Urozhay Krasnodar players
Russian Second League players
Russian First League players